= Committee on Government Operations =

Committee on Government Operations may refer to:

- United States House Committee on Government Operations, defunct committee whose function is currently within purview of the United States House Committee on Oversight and Government Reform
- United States Senate Committee on Government Operations, defunct committee whose function is currently within purview of the United States Senate Committee on Homeland Security and Governmental Affairs
